Smokey Smith is a 1935 American Western film directed by Robert N. Bradbury and starring Bob Steele. It was remade in 1950 as Crooked River.

Cast
 Bob Steele as Smokey Smith
 George 'Gabby' Hayes as Blaze Bart (as George Hayes)
 Mary Kornman as Bess Bart
 Warner Richmond as Kent
 Earl Dwire as Sheriff
 Horace B. Carpenter as Dad Smith (as Horace Carpenter)
 Vane Calvert as Mrs. Smith

References

External links
 

1935 films
1935 Western (genre) films
American Western (genre) films
American black-and-white films
1930s English-language films
Films directed by Robert N. Bradbury
1930s American films